Tazeh Kand-e Masqaran (also Romanized as Tāzeh Kand-e Masqarān and Tāzeh Kand Masqarān; also known as Tazakend, Tāzeh Kand, and Tazeh Kand Masfaran) is a village in Azghan Rural District, in the Central District of Ahar County, East Azerbaijan Province, Iran. At the 2006 census, its population was 319, in 75 families.

References 

Populated places in Ahar County